Ludolph Anne Jan Wilt, Baron Sloet van de Beele (28 March 1806 – 10 December 1890) was the Governor-General of the Dutch East Indies in 1861–1866.

References

External links 
 

1806 births
1890 deaths
Dutch nobility
Governors-General of the Dutch East Indies
Members of the House of Representatives (Netherlands)
People from Voorst
Utrecht University alumni